Clay Township is one of eleven townships in Howard County, Indiana, United States. As of the 2010 census, its population was 3,885 and it contained 1,565 housing units. This township also contains a small portion of Kokomo. The population of the Kokomo portion, however, is zero.

History
Clay Township was named for Henry Clay, a politician and statesman from Kentucky.

The Henry W. Smith House was listed on the National Register of Historic Places in 1979.

Geography

The stream of Villa Run runs through this township.

Former Settlements
Jewell Station

Adjacent townships
 Jackson Township, Cass County (north)
 Deer Creek Township, Miami County (northeast)
 Howard Township (east)
 Center Township (southeast)
 Harrison Township (south)
 Monroe Township (southwest)
 Ervin Township (west)

Major highways

Airports and landing strips
 Hartman Farms Field

References
 
 United States Census Bureau cartographic boundary files

External links
 Indiana Township Association
 United Township Association of Indiana

Townships in Howard County, Indiana
Kokomo, Indiana metropolitan area
Townships in Indiana